Manny Pacquiao vs. Jessie Vargas, billed as The Legend/The Champ, was a boxing match for the WBO welterweight championship. The event took place on November 5, 2016 at the Thomas & Mack Center in Las Vegas, Nevada. Pacquiao won the fight by unanimous decision and took the WBO welterweight title. The fight sold 300,000 pay-per-view (PPV) buys in the United States (US), earning an estimated  in pay-per-view revenue.

Background 
On August 3, Pacquiao's business manager confirmed that WBO welterweight champion Jessie Vargas (27–1, 10 KO) would be the next opponent for Pacquiao on November 5, at the Thomas & Mack Center in Las Vegas, Nevada. Pacquiao made the confirmation after a two-hour meeting with Top Rank's Bob Arum and Canadian adviser Michael Koncz held in Manila on August 7, that he agreed to fight Vargas. "Yes, the fight is on. I have agreed to a Nov. 5 fight with reigning WBO welterweight champion Jessie Vargas. Boxing is my passion. I miss what I'd been doing inside the gym and atop the ring. My entire training camp will be held here in the Philippines so I can attend to my legislative works. This is my campaign promise and I'm determined to keep it," Pacquiao said in a statement. He also explained that he has to fight again to earn a living: "Boxing is my main source of income. I can't rely on my salary as public official. I'm helping the family of my wife and my own family, as well. Many people also come to me to ask for help and I just couldn't ignore them."

In a press conference on September 8 held in Los Angeles, California, it was announced by Bob Arum that the fight would be self-distributed by Top Rank PPV. He also revealed that his company would continue to produce and distribute future pay-per-view events without the involvement of HBO. As for the commentating panel, Arum stressed that he planned on putting a star-studded announcing team together, which would rival the work of HBO's Jim Lampley and Max Kellerman. Arum confided that he was in talks with major boxing analysts, but he declined to name one as he had not worked out any official deals yet. "I think the commentating team is going to blow everybody's socks off," he vowed. According to Arum, Top Rank's initial plans had received a good feedback from its partners and television companies, which gave him a hindsight that they could pull it off. "They're all very, very receptive to getting this kind of programming. But right now, this looks like the most likely scenario," Arum stated.

Fight details 
Floyd Mayweather Jr. made an entrance and sat ringside with his daughter before the main event began. When asked why he was at the fight, he replied, "I'm just taking her to the fight.", whilst pointing to his daughter.

In front of 16,132 in attendance, Pacquiao defeated Vargas in a lopsided unanimous decision to win the WBO welterweight title for the third time. In the second round, Pacquiao caught Vargas with a straight left counter, dropping him to the canvas. In the eighth round, an accidental clash of heads opened a deep cut on Vargas’ right eyebrow. However, replays between rounds clearly showed that the cut above Vargas’ eye in the eighth was caused by a left straight punch, which the Nevada Athletic Commission had ruled. In the eleventh round, Vargas went down on a slip, tripping over his feet after he got hit by a right. Vargas went down again in the twelfth round, but Kenny Bayless ruled it another slip. Pacquiao won on all three ringside scorecards—118–109, 118–109 and 114–113.

According to CompuBox statistics, Pacquiao landed 147 of 409 of his punches (36%) and Vargas landed 104 of 562 of his punches thrown (19%). Pacquiao was guaranteed $4 million plus a percentage of the revenue of the fight while Vargas was guaranteed $2.5 million.

Fight card

Broadcasting 
For this event, the organizers Top Rank, broadcast, produced and distributed the event on their own under the "Top Rank PPV" brand instead of it being broadcast by HBO, the broadcaster of most Pacquiao fights in the United States. The reason was because the latter had scheduled an event on November 19 and because Pacquiao insisted that HBO broadcast his bout between November 5 and November 14, due to his busy schedule and participation in the Philippine senate, where he is a senator. Because of this, both domestic and international feeds carried the Top Rank-produced broadcast.

MLB Network's Brian Kenny, ESPN's Stephen A. Smith and boxer Timothy Bradley served as ringside commentators, Crystina Poncher handled interviews and updates in the locker room, while Fox Sports and Extras Charissa Thompson handled as the hostess of the event.

While the broadcast was a success in the US, some international countries (including the Philippines, Pacquiao's home country) had some "minor" problems when the fight was broadcast. Portions where the ringside commentators or Charissa Thompson would appear on camera would be cut out and replaced with different shots of the arena. Another was the post-fight interview of the main bout, where it was replaced with natural crowd noise, making it hard to hear what Pacquiao, Vargas and Stephen A. Smith were actually saying (the latter had a little audio noise, but the fighters were harder to hear).

 Fight purses Guaranteed base purses'
 Manny Pacquiao ($4,000,000) vs. Jessie Vargas ($2,800,000)
 Oscar Valdez ($200,000) vs. Hiroshige Osawa ($50,000)
 Nonito Donaire ($400,000) vs. Jessie Magdaleno ($90,000)
 Zou Shiming ($5,000) vs. Prasitsak Phaprom ($5,000)

References

External links 

2016 in boxing
2016 in sports in Nevada
21st century in Las Vegas
Vargas
Boxing in Las Vegas
November 2016 sports events in the United States